Izcuchaca District is one of nineteen small districts of the province Huancavelica in Peru.

References